Sempan or Nararapi is a language spoken in Western New Guinea.

References

Asmat-Kamoro languages
Languages of western New Guinea